Shadows is Canadian singer Gordon Lightfoot's fifteenth original album, released in 1982 on the Warner Brothers Records label. It peaked at #87 on the Billboard charts.

The album marked another significant turning point in Lightfoot's musical evolution. He moves further away from his acoustic roots through greater use of synthesizers and electric organ.

The album is softer in composition than its immediate predecessors with a return to slower, more introspective ballads as compared to the faster, country style of Lightfoot's mid-1970s albums.

Although a commercial failure (Lightfoot referred to it as "the music industry's best-kept secret"), the critical reception of the album was positive.

"Baby Step Back" peaked at number 17 on the US Adult Contemporary chart and #50 on the Billboard Hot 100. It also reached number six on the Canadian Adult Contemporary chart.

Track listing
All songs composed by Gordon Lightfoot.

"14 Karat Gold" – 3:56
"In My Fashion" – 3:05
"Shadows" – 3:02
"Blackberry Wine" – 3:05
"Heaven Help the Devil" – 3:14
"Thank You For the Promises" – 2:53
"Baby Step Back" – 3:59
"All I'm After" – 3:23
"Triangle" – 4:10
"I'll Do Anything" – 3:25
"She's Not the Same" – 3:11

Personnel
Gordon Lightfoot – vocals, harmony vocals, rhythm guitar
Rick Haynes – bass guitar
Terry Clements – lead guitar
Barry Keane – drums, percussion
Michael Heffernan – keyboards, synthesizer
Pee Wee Charles – steel guitar, dobro
Dean Parks – electric guitar
Dennis Pendrith – bass guitar
Robbie Buchanan – synthesizer
Victor Feldman – percussion
Herb Pedersen – harmony vocals
Patrick Miles – electric guitar

References

External links
Album lyrics and chords

Gordon Lightfoot albums
1982 albums
Warner Records albums